Rojid is a village in Barwala Taluka, Gujarat, India. The total geographical area of village is 2235.97 hectares.

References

Villages in Ahmedabad district
Settlements in Gujarat